The 1983 Tolly Cobbold Classic was the fifth edition of the professional invitational snooker tournament, which took place from 21 to 23 February 1983.
The tournament was played at the Corn Exchange in Ipswich, and featured eight professional players.

Steve Davis won the title for the second time in succession, beating Terry Griffiths 7–5 in the final.

Main draw

Final

Century breaks

100  Steve Davis

References

Tolly Cobbold Classic
Tolly Cobbold Classic
Tolly Cobbold Classic
Tolly Cobbold Classic